Jimmy Bloomer may refer to:

 Jimmy Bloomer (footballer, born 1926) (1926–2011), Scottish football inside forward
 Jimmy Bloomer (footballer, born 1947), Scottish football defender